Lumpley Games is an American game company that produces role-playing games and game supplements.

History
Vincent Baker began using "lumpley" email addresses and URLs in kill puppies for satan (2002); he had used the name on various online systems, and it would quickly become the name of Baker's indie publishing company too. Baker produced 40 or 50 copies of the game and sold them all, which would give them the money for his next project; Baker says that he hasn't put a dime into Lumpley since that initial investment. The Cheap and Cheesy Fantasy Game (2001) was the first game by Baker that called itself "a lumpley game." Lumpley Games published Baker's Dogs in the Vineyard (2004). In 2010, Baker replaced the Forge GenCon booth with a small booth for just himself and Lumpley Press.

References

External links
 Lumpley Games official site

Role-playing game publishing companies